Louisiana State University Laboratory School (U-High) is a laboratory school under Louisiana State University and is one of two laboratory schools in Baton Rouge. The other is Southern University Laboratory School (commonly known as "Southern Lab"), which is operated by Southern University on the north side of the city.
 
The school was established by the College of Education, now known as the College of Human Sciences and Education, of Louisiana State University and has operated under its auspices for nearly 100 years. This coeducational school exists as an independent system to provide training opportunities for pre- and in-service teachers and to serve as a demonstration and educational research center. Since the school is part of the LSU system, students are required to pay tuition. The school is located on the main campus of Louisiana State University in Baton Rouge, a center for the petrochemical industry and a major deep-water port. Baton Rouge is the capital of Louisiana with a population of over 600,000.

The school was designated a National Blue Ribbon School in 2015 & 2022.

Athletics
U-High Lab athletics competes in the LHSAA.

Championships
Football championships
(8) State Championships: 1957, 1974, 1988, 2013, 2014, 2017, 2018, 2021

Notable alumni
 Elizabeth Ashley, actress
 Bradford Banta, former NFL professional football player (Indianapolis Colts) and standout at USC
 Glen Davis, former professional basketball player for the Los Angeles Clippers of the NBA and standout at LSU
 Jimmy Field, Baton Rouge lawyer and member of the Louisiana Public Service Commission from 1996 to 2012
 Brian Kinchen, former NFL professional football player and standout at LSU
 Richard Baker (Class of 1966), former member of the Louisiana House from East Baton Rouge parish from 1979–1987 (as a Democrat) and U.S. House of Representatives from Louisiana's 6th Congressional District from 1987–2008 (as a Republican)
 Johnny Robinson (Class of 1956), former NFL professional football player (Kansas City Chiefs) and standout at LSU; 2021 Pro Football Hall of Fame inductee
 Steven Soderbergh, Hollywood director of several films including Ocean's Eleven
 Darryl Hamilton, former Major League Baseball player
 Doug Moreau, former district attorney of East Baton Rouge Parish, Louisiana and former LSU football player
 Garrett Temple, basketball player
 Hall Davis V, former University of Louisiana at Lafayette defensive end, selected 149th overall in the 5th round by the St. Louis Rams in the 2010 NFL Draft.
 Rheagan Courville, former elite gymnast and LSU Lady Tigers gymnastics team member.
 Tim Williams, Linebacker, Seattle Seahawks, Former Alabama Standout
 Patrick Reed, professional golfer and 2018 Masters Champion

References

External links
UHS homepage
LSU homepage

Schools in Baton Rouge, Louisiana
Educational institutions established in 1915
Public high schools in Louisiana
Public middle schools in Louisiana
Public elementary schools in Louisiana
University-affiliated schools in the United States
Laboratory schools in the United States
1915 establishments in Louisiana
International Baccalaureate schools in Louisiana
Louisiana State University